PTX Presents: Top Pop, Vol. I (alternatively written PTX Presents: Top Pop, Vol. 1) is the sixth studio album by American a cappella group Pentatonix, released on April 13, 2018. It is their first album with bass vocalist Matt Sallee, and without original bass vocalist Avi Kaplan. It is also their first full-length album not to feature any original material.

Production 
The album was announced on February 27, 2018, together with a new tour in the following summer. Pentatonix announced the tracklist on April 10.

Three singles from the album were released before the release: "Havana" on February 23, 2018, "New Rules x Are You That Somebody?" on March 9, and "Attention" on March 23. Pentatonix released a performance of a mashup of songs on the album on YouTube on April 19, 2018.

Reception 

AllMusic gave the album a rating of 3 out of 5, stating "Make no mistake, [Pentatonix] are still proudly the children of Glee, but that's also the ace up their sleeve: they're flashy about their hip attributes, which helps disguise how this album is -- at its core -- music by a very good music theater troupe."

Track listing

Personnel 
 Scott Hoying – baritone lead and backing vocals
 Mitch Grassi – tenor lead and backing vocals
 Kirstin Maldonado – alto lead and backing vocals
 Matt Sallee – vocal bass, vocal percussion at the end of "Havana", bass lead and backing vocals
 Kevin Olusola – vocal percussion, backing vocals, vocal flugelhorn at the end of "Havana", cello on "Perfect"

Charts

References 

Pentatonix albums
2018 albums
RCA Records albums